"The Letter" is the debut single by American rock band the Box Tops, released in 1967. It was the group's first and biggest record chart hit, reaching number one in the United States and Canada. It was also an international success and placed in the top ten in several other countries. The song was written by Wayne Carson.

The Box Tops lead vocalist Alex Chilton sang "The Letter" in a gruff blue-eyed soul style.  The song launched Chilton's career and inspired numerous cover versions.  English rock and soul singer Joe Cocker's 1970 rendition became his first top ten single in the U.S.; several other artists have recorded versions which also reached the record charts.

Rolling Stone magazine included the Box Tops original at number 372 on its list of the "500 Greatest Songs of All Time", and the Rock and Roll Hall of Fame added it to the list of the "500 Songs That Shaped Rock and Roll".  In 2011, the single was inducted into the Grammy Hall of Fame.

Composition and recording
Wayne Carson wrote "The Letter", built on an opening line suggested by his father: "Give me a ticket for an aeroplane". Carson included the song on a demo tape he gave to Chips Moman, owner of American Sound Studio in Memphis, Tennessee. When studio associate Dan Penn was looking for an opportunity to produce more, Moman suggested a local group, the DeVilles, who had a new lead singer, sixteen year-old Alex Chilton. The other four members of the group that played on the session were Danny Smythe on drums, Richard Malone on electric guitar, John Evans on electric piano, and Russ Caccamisi on bass. Penn gave the group Carson's demo tape for some songs to work up. With little or no rehearsal, the group arrived at American Sound to record "The Letter". Chilton recalled:

Penn added: "The guitar player had the lick right—we copied Wayne's demo. Then I asked the keyboard player to play an 'I'm a Believer' type of thing". Chilton sang the vocal live while the group was performing; Penn noted: "I coached him [Chilton] a little... told him to say 'aer-o-plane,' told him to get a little gruff, and I didn't have to say anything else to him, he was hookin 'em, a natural singer."  He later explained, "[Chilton] picked it up exactly as I had in mind, maybe even better. I hadn't even paid any attention to how good he sang because I was busy trying to put the band together... I had a bunch of greenhorns who'd never cut a record, including me".

About thirty takes were required for the basic track. Then Penn had Mike Leech prepare a string and horn arrangement to give it a fuller sound.  Leech recalled: "My very first string arrangement was 'The Letter', and the only reason I did that was because I knew how to write music notation... Nobody else in the group did or I'm sure someone else would have gotten the call." Penn also overdubbed the sound of an airplane taking off to the track from a special effects record that had been checked out from the local library. He explained:

Edwin Pouncey of The Wire described the "sampling" of the overhead jet plane as one of the more notable "pop and rock musique concrète flirtations" of the period.

The DeVilles were renamed the Box Tops and "The Letter", at only 1 minute, 58 seconds, was released by Mala Records, a subsidiary of Bell Records.

Chart performance
"The Letter" reached number one on the Hot 100 singles chart published by Billboard magazine on September 23, 1967.  It remained at the top position for four weeks and Billboard ranked the record the number two song for 1967.  The single sold more than one million copies and the RIAA certified it as gold.

Joe Cocker renditions

English singer Joe Cocker recorded "The Letter" during the rehearsals for his upcoming Mad Dogs and Englishmen tour on March 17, 1970. Leon Russell and the Shelter People provided the back up; Russell and Denny Cordell produced the recording. A&M Records released it as a single, with "Space Captain" as the B-side. It appeared in Billboard's Hot 100 in April 1970 and eventually reached number seven.  "The Letter" became Cocker's first top ten single in the US. In the UK, the single reached number 39.

Cocker performed it (and "Space Captain") during his 1970 performance at the Fillmore East auditorium in New York City. Recordings of both songs are included on the live Mad Dogs & Englishmen album, which was released in August 1970 and was a best seller. The concert was also filmed in its entirety and released in theaters. In 2003, it was released on DVD.

Chart performance

Other charting renditions
In 1979, a version by country singer Sammi Smith reached number 27 on the Billboard Hot Country Singles chart. A year later in the UK, Amii Stewart's version reached number 39 on the UK Singles Chart.

References

1967 songs
1967 debut singles
1970 singles
The Box Tops songs
Joe Cocker songs
Songs about letters (message)
Grammy Hall of Fame Award recipients
Billboard Hot 100 number-one singles
Cashbox number-one singles
RPM Top Singles number-one singles
A&M Records singles
Songs written by Wayne Carson
Song recordings produced by Denny Cordell